Eugen Miskolczy (: 16 January 190718 January 1947) was a Croatian physician, partisan and major in the Yugoslav People's Army.

Miskolczy was born in Vinkovci on 16 January 1907 to a notable Croatian Jewish family Miskolczy. In Vinkovci he finished elementary school and in 1925 the Gymnasium Vinkovci, among the best in class. In 1931, he graduated from the Medical University of Vienna. Miskolczy finished internship at hospitals in Vienna and Zagreb. In 1933, he returned to Vinkovci where he was granted a medical practice permit and was employed as a city physician. During World War II, he worked as a volunteer at Đakovo camp providing medical assistance to all inmates: Jews, Romani and Croats. Miskolczy particularly took care of Jewish children who he moved, with the camp authorities' permission, to Jewish homes in Osijek and Vinkovci. In order to avoid arrest and deportation, all members of the Miskolczy family escaped to the Croatian Littoral. In 1942, Miskolczy joined the Partisans. He was placed in the medical unit and, in 1943, he was named a liaison officer between the Croatian general headquarters and the British military missions led by Randolph Churchill. During 1944, Miskolczy was commander of the medical unit in the III Banija and IV Lika partisan brigades.

After the war, he was named director of the Karlovac hospital, a position he held until his death. He received numerous war and post-war medals and decorations. Miskolczy died on 18 January 1947 in Karlovac and was buried in the Vinkovci family tomb at the Jewish part of the cemetery.

References

Bibliography 

  
 
 

1907 births
1947 deaths
People from Vinkovci
Croatian Jews
Croatian Austro-Hungarians
Croatian military doctors
Jewish physicians
Jews in the Yugoslav Partisans
Yugoslav Partisans members
Croatian people of World War II
Yugoslav physicians